Beck Motorsports was a team in the Indy Racing League IndyCar Series owned by Greg Beck.  At times in its history the team was partnered with Curb Agajanian Performance Group and 3G Racing owners Stanton Barrett and Steve Sudler.

IndyCar

1995–2000
Beck Motorsports first arrived in 1995 to field an entry for Japanese driver Hideshi Matsuda in the Indianapolis 500 and finished 15th. In 1996 with the split in major open-wheel racing, the team sided with the Indy Racing League and fielded a full-time entry for Robbie Buhl who finished 3rd in the series' first race at Walt Disney World Speedway and finished 3rd in points. They also fielded another Indy 500 entry for Matsuda who finished a career-best 8th. Buhl began the 1996 races of the 1996-1997 season but left for the powerhouse Team Menard in 1997, leaving Beck to only field an entry for Dennis Vitolo in the Indy 500. The team suffered from severely underpowered Infiniti engines and had to controversially rely on a guaranteed starting position from the "25 and 8 rule" based on their points from the 1996 season in order to make the race. Vitolo finished 15th. Beck Motorsports did not return for the 1998 season.

They returned for a one-off entry for the 1999 Indianapolis 500, again with Matsuda who qualified and finished 10th. Matsuda returned in 2000 but failed to qualify.

2001: First partnership with Curb Agajanian
For the 2001 season, the team partnered with Curb Agajanian Performance Group and returned to full-time competition with veteran driver Billy Boat. Boat finished 2nd at Nashville Superspeedway and finished 4th in points.

2002–2003
In 2002 Beck Motorsports fielded a car in 3 mid-season races for Robby McGehee.  Beck fielded a car at Motegi and the Indy 500 for Japanese former F1 driver Shinji Nakano who finished 14th .

2004–2009: Second partnership with Curb Agajanian
In 2004 CURB/Agajanian/Beck Motorsports came into being and P. J. Jones drove their entry in the Indy 500 to a 28th place DNF. In 2005, the team fielded a last-minute Indy 500 entry for rookie Arie Luyendyk Jr., however the car never handled properly and Luyendyk's best speed was easily bumped by Felipe Giaffone, leaving Luyendyk and the C/A/B team the only entry bumped from the field that year.

The team merged with Team Leader Motorsports to field 2 cars for the 2006 Indianapolis 500. The first team with driver P. J. Jones was Beck Motorsports owned by Greg Beck which was founded in 1995. The second team driven by Stephan Gregoire was owned by Kent Baker which was founded in 1988. Both Baker and Beck had many years experience working with their own and various other Indy Car teams. They were joined by Cary Agajanian and Mike Curb of Curb Agajanian Motorsports.  The two teams ended their partnership for 2007 with P. J. Jones competing for Team Leader Motorsports.

The team made a surprise entry into the 2007 XM Satellite Radio Indy 300 at Homestead-Miami Speedway and participated in it, the Kansas Speedway race and the Indy 500. Alex Barron drove in all 3 races and finished 15th in the Indy 500, 1 lap down.

The team made its 2008 debut at Twin Ring Motegi with Roger Yasukawa at the controls. Yasukawa also attempted to qualify the Curb Records car in the Indianapolis 500 as well but was bumped from the field.

In 2009, the team fielded a full-time  IndyCar Series entry, beginning the season with NASCAR driver Stanton Barrett behind the wheel.  Barrett and sports marketer Steve Sudler both joined as partners of the team and the new name was CURB/Agajanian/3G Racing (3 Guys Racing). Jaques Lazier was brought on to replace Barrett at Texas Motor Speedway after the team went home after a practice crash the previous week at the Milwaukee Mile. Lazier drove the next three oval races and Richard Antinucci was brought in to drive the remaining road and street course races of the schedule. Barrett drove at Twin Ring Motegi, where he had sponsorship, and Lazier drove on all other remaining ovals.

2010
The team did not announce any plans for 2010, but Sudler indicated in an interview that they hoped to find sponsorship to run a full schedule for Antinucci and a part-time schedule for Barrett. The team did not appear at any races in 2010.

Past drivers

CART/IRL IndyCar Series

Beck Motorsports
 Robbie Buhl (1996-1997)
 Hideshi Matsuda (1995-1996, 1998-1999)
 Robby McGehee (2002)
 Shinji Nakano (2003)
 Dennis Vitolo (1997)

CURB/Agajanian/Beck
 Alex Barron (2007)
 Billy Boat (2001-2002)
 P. J. Jones (2004)
 Roger Yasukawa (2008)

Team Leader Motorsports
 Stephan Gregoire (2006)
 P. J. Jones (2006)

CURB/Agaganian/3G Racing
 Richard Antinucci (2009)
 Stanton Barrett (2009)
 Jaques Lazier (2009)

Race Results

CART FedEx Championship Results
(key) (results in bold indicate pole position) (results in italics indicate fastest lap)

Indy Racing League Results
(key) (Results in bold indicate pole position; results in italics indicate fastest lap)

References

IndyCar Series teams
American auto racing teams